The Globoroatioidea (Globorotaliacea in older classifications) constitutes a superfamily of Cenozoic plantonic foraminifera. It is part of the suborder Globigerinina. Globoroatioidea have trochospiral tests with rounded to carinate peripheries, the walls of which are of finely lamellar, perforate, of optically radial calcite, with an inner organic lining. The surface of these tests is smooth, lacking spines, but may be covered with pustules or pitted, and may have one or more large pores at the center. There is a single primary aperture that may be bordered by an imperforate lip, as well as possible supplementary apertures.

Families included in the Globoroatioidea, in temporal sequence, as per  Loeblich and Tappan, 1988, are the:
Eoglobigerinidae  L. Paleocene (L. Danian)
Truncorotaloididae  M. Paleocene to U.Eocene
Catapsydracidae  Paleocene to Holocene
Globorotaliidae  Paleocene to Holocene
Candeinidae M. Eocene to Holocene     
Pulleniatinidae  M. Miocene to Holocene

Earlier, Loeblich and Tappan, 1964, in the Treatise on Invertebrate Paleontology, Part C, in which foraminiferal taxa are ranked as an Order rather than as a Class, the equivalent Globorataliidae included only the subfamilies Globorotaliinae and  Truncorotaliinae. The other four families now included in the Globorotaliacea are based on taxa that were included in the Globigerinidae.

References

 A. R. Loeblich & H. Tappan, 1964. Sarcodina Chiefly "Thecamoebians" and Foraminiferida; Treatise on Invertebrate Paleontology, Part C Protista 2. 
Loeblich & Tappan, 1988. Forminiferal Genera and their Classification. E-book 

Foraminifera superfamilies
Globigerinina